Callindra equitalis is a moth of the family Erebidae. It was described by Vincenz Kollar in 1844. It is found in China (Yunnan, Sichuan, Hunan, Shaanxi), Kashmir, the Himalayas, Sikkim, Nepal and Myanmar.

References

Callimorphina
Moths of Asia
Lepidoptera of Nepal
Fauna of the Himalayas
Fauna of Tibet
Taxa named by Vincenz Kollar
Moths described in 1844